Galaxias Chaos is an area of broken landscape in the Cebrenia quadrangle of Mars, located at 34.1° N and  213.6° W.  It is 234.0 km across and was named after an albedo feature name. Galaxias Chaos may be caused by sublimation of an ice-rich deposit.

See also
 Chaos terrain
 Climate of Mars
 Geology of Mars 
 List of areas of chaos terrain on Mars
Martian chaos terrain
 Outflow channels
 Water on Mars

References

External links 

Cebrenia quadrangle
Chaotic terrains on Mars